The men's 68 kg competition in taekwondo at the 2022 Mediterranean Games was held on 3 July at the Mohammed Ben Ahmed Convention Centre in Oran.

Results
 Legend
 PTG — Won by Points Gap
 SUP — Won by superiority
 OT — Won on over time (Golden Point)
 DQ — Won by disqualification
 PUN — Won by punitive declaration
 WD — Won by withdrawal

Final

Top half

Bottom half

References

M68